Ghosts of the Abyss is a 2003 American documentary film produced by Walden Media and released in most countries by Walt Disney Pictures. It was directed by James Cameron after his 1997 film Titanic. During August and September 2001, Cameron and a group of scientists staged an expedition to the wreck of the RMS Titanic and dived in Russian deep-submersibles to obtain more detailed images than anyone had before. With the help of two small, purpose-built remotely operated vehicles, nicknamed "Jake" and "Elwood", the audience too can see inside the Titanic, and with the help of CGI, audiences can view the ship's original appearance superimposed on the deep-dive images.

Also along for the ride Cameron invited his friend, actor Bill Paxton, who played Brock Lovett in the 1997 film. Paxton narrates the event through his eyes. The film premiered for IMAX 3D and was nominated for a BFCA award for Best Documentary. The submersibles Mir 1 and Mir 2 carried the filming team on 12 dives.

The film is also known as Titanic 3D: Ghosts of the Abyss.

Outline
Director James Cameron returns to the site of the 1912 wreck of the RMS Titanic, aboard the Russian research vessel Akademik Mstislav Keldysh with a team of history and marine experts, and his friend Bill Paxton. Cameron and the crew document the interiors and exteriors of the wreckage using 3D technology designed for the documentary. While diving on September 11, 2001, the filming crew hears about the 9/11 attacks on the World Trade Center and the Pentagon. Afterward, they all compare and reflect on the tragedy of 9/11 with the tragedy of the Titanic.

Cast
Throughout the movie, there are re-enactments of events that are discussed that use CGI recreations of the interior of the Titanic.
 Don Lynch as Titanics designer Thomas Andrews
 Ken Marschall as White Star Line President J. Bruce Ismay
 Miguel Wilkins as Qm. Robert Hichens
 Federico Zambrano as John Jacob Astor IV
 Dale Ridge as Elizabeth Lines
 Judy Prestininzi as Molly Brown
 Adrianna Valdez as Helen Churchill Candee
 Justin Shaw as Wireless Officer  Jack Phillips
 Thomas Kilroy as Poker Player
 Charlie Arneson as First Officer William Murdoch
 Piper Gunnarson as Madeleine Astor
 John Donovan as Captain Edward Smith
 Janace Tashjian as Edith Russell
 Jesse Baker as Second Officer Charles Lightoller
 Justin Baker as Junior Wireless Officer Harold Bride
 Aaron C. Fitzgerald as Lookout Frederick Fleet
 Bill Paxton as The Narrator

Release
The film was screened out of competition at the 2003 Cannes Film Festival.

Home media
The feature film on the DVD is 90 minutes long and is available in a two-disc edition and as the fifth disc in the Titanic five-Disc Deluxe Limited Edition.

Walt Disney Studios Home Entertainment released the film on a three-disc Blu-ray 3D, Blu-ray and DVD edition on September 11, 2012.

Rolling Stone included the documentary in its list of the best 3D movies ever, in 2012.

Reception

Box office
The film grossed $17.1 million from a maximum release of 97 theaters in the United States. It also grossed $11.7 million internationally, for a total worldwide gross of $28.8 million.

Critical response

Review aggregator Rotten Tomatoes reports that the documentary earned 80% positive reviews based on 102 reviews and an average score of 7.10/10. The website's critical consensus reads: "The underwater footage is both beautiful and awe-inspiring." On Metacritic, the film has an average score of 67 out of 100 from 24 critics, indicating "generally favorable reviews".

Soundtrack

The official soundtrack's score were composed and conducted by Joel McNeely, and the orchestrations were conducted by David Brown, Marshall Bowen, and Frank Macchia. The album was also recorded and mixed by Rich Breen, edited by Craig Pettigrew, and mastered by Pat Sullivan. The album was ultimately produced by James Cameron, Randy Gerston and Joel McNeely and released by Disney's Hollywood Records label. Part of the film was filmed in Halifax, Nova Scotia, Canada.

Toad the Wet Sprocket lead singer and songwriter Glen Phillips contributed the opening track, "Departure". James Cameron loved the band's 1991 track "Nightingale Song" but found Columbia Records' licensing fee too high (it wanted over $5,000 for the use of the one minute he wanted to use) so he contacted the band's management hoping they could re-record it for his film, only to find they had broken up in 1998 and could not. However, during the negotiations Cameron asked if Phillips would be interested in writing a new track in the spirit of the older song and "Departure" was created. it was produced, mixed, and all instruments played by Phillips in his garage studio though this was not credited in the CD booklet.

Track listing

References

External links
 
 Ghosts of the Abyss Educator's Guide by Walden Media
 
 
 
 

2003 films
2003 3D films
2003 documentary films
American 3D films
American documentary films
Disney documentary films
Documentary films about RMS Titanic
Films directed by James Cameron
Hollywood Records soundtracks
IMAX short films
Walt Disney Pictures films
Walden Media films
Films scored by Joel McNeely
IMAX documentary films
3D documentary films
2000s English-language films
2000s American films